Mandy Jacklin (née Brundle) is a former English international lawn bowler.

In 1998 she represented England at the 1998 Commonwealth Games in Kuala Lumpur and won a bronze medal in the fours event with Norma Shaw, Catherine Anton and Shirley Page.

Under her maiden name of Mandy Brundle she won a national champion title in the fours, representing Huntingdonshire.

References

Living people
Commonwealth Games medallists in lawn bowls
Commonwealth Games bronze medallists for England
Bowls players at the 1998 Commonwealth Games
English female bowls players
Year of birth missing (living people)
Medallists at the 1998 Commonwealth Games